HMSHost is an American highway and airport food-service company, a wholly owned subsidiary of the Italian company  Autogrill S.p.A. , Steve Johnson is the CEO of HMSHost.

History

The company's origins are in the Van Noy Railway News and Hotel Company founded in 1897 by the Van Noy Brothers of Kansas City, Missouri.

On January 2, 1996, Host Marriott Services Corporation was created when Host Marriott Corporation divided into two separate companies. Host Marriott continued to own lodging real estate. Host Marriott Services Corporation held and operates concessions at airports, at rest stops on toll roads and freeways and at sports and entertainment attractions.  Autogrill S.p.A. acquired the company in 1999, creating HMSHost.

Along the way, the company grew through its many acquisitions.  It found itself with airport contracts in 18 of the 20 largest airports in the United States. Through Kilmer Host Service Centres, a joint venture with the Canadian company Kilmer van Nostrand, HMSHost is also a partner in ONroute service centres in the Canadian province of Ontario. Today the company manages franchise locations in 120 airports across North America and 80 highway stops in the northeastern and midwestern United States.

In 2021, HMSHost sold their United States toll road service area operations to Iris Buyer, LLC, a consortium of Blackstone Infrastructure Partners and Applegreen for $375 million.

See also
Van Noy Railway News and Hotel Company

References

External links

Marriott International
Companies based in Kansas City, Missouri
Companies based in Bethesda, Maryland